Far West League may refer to:

Far West League (1948–1951), an American baseball minor league
Far West League (collegiate summer baseball league)